Acker Island (also known as Lost Isle) is a small island in the Sacramento–San Joaquin River Delta. It is part of San Joaquin County, California. It appears on a 1952 USGS map of the area.

References

Islands of San Joaquin County, California
Islands of the Sacramento–San Joaquin River Delta
Islands of Northern California